Karl-May-Spiele Bischofswerda is a theatre festival in Germany.

Theatre festivals in Germany
Karl May